The 2015 Kazakhstan Cup Final was the 24th final of the Kazakhstan Cup. The match was contested by Kairat and Astana at Astana Arena in Astana. The match was played on 21 November 2015 and was the final match of the competition.

Background
Kairat were playing a record ninth Kazakhstan Cup final. They had previously won 6, most recently last season's final against Aktobe. Their most recent defeat in the final was in 2005, losing 2–1 to Zhenis.

It was Astana's third final. They had won both previous finals, most recently in 2012 with a 2–0 win over Irtysh.

Kairat and Astana had played twice during the league season. In the first game, on April 19, 2015 Astana won 4–3 at Astana Arena. Georgy Zhukov, Nemanja Maksimovic, Bauyrzhan Dzholchiyev and Tanat Nusserbayev scored for Astana, and Gerard Gohou scored twice and Bauyrzhan Islamkhan scored once for Kairat. On June 28, 2015, Kairat won a victory 2–0 with goals from Isael and Bauyrzhan Islamkhan's penalty.

Route to the Final

Kairat

Astana

Match

Details

Statistics

References

2015
2015 domestic association football cups
2015 in Kazakhstani football
FC Astana matches
FC Kairat matches